Dichilanthe is a genus of flowering plants in the family Rubiaceae. The genus is found in Borneo and Sri Lanka.

Species 

 Dichilanthe borneensis Baill. - west-central Borneo
 Dichilanthe zeylanica Thwaites - southwestern Sri Lanka

References

External links 

 Dichilanthe in the World Checklist of Rubiaceae

Rubiaceae genera
Guettardeae